Shuqba is a Palestinian town in the Ramallah and al-Bireh Governorate, located 17 kilometers northwest of the city of Ramallah in Palestine.

Shuqba has a total area of 13,990 dunams, and the built-up area comprises 616 dunams.  Shuqba was home to approximately 4,497 inhabitants in 2007.

Location
Shuqba is located  17,9 km northwest of Ramallah. It bordered by Deir abu Mash'al  and Al-Itihad to the east,  and Ni'lin, Qibya and Shabtin to the south.

To the west is the Green line, and to the north is 'Abud, Rantis, and Israeli settlement of Ofarim.

History

Dorothy Garrod studied the transition of Mesolithic to Neolithic culture represented in a cave on the northern bank of Wadi an-Natuf near Shuqba in 1928. The name "Natufian Culture" was then coined to describe the inhabitants of the southern Levant at this crucial juncture in human history.

Sherds from Iron Age I-II, Iron Age II,   Persian, Hellenistic, Roman Empire,  Byzantine and Mamluk eras have been found.

Ottoman era
Sherds from the early Ottoman era have been found here. In 1596 Shuqba was a part of the nahiya ("subdistrict") of Ramla, which was under the administration Gaza Sanjak.  In the tax records that year it had a population of 49 household who were all Muslims. They paid a fixed tax-rate of 25% on agricultural products, including wheat, barley, summer crops, olive trees, goats and beehives, in addition to occasional revenues and a press for olives or grape syrup; a total of 2,600 akçe.

In 1870, Victor Guérin noted that the houses of  Kharbet Choukba were very roughly built; and that the village  contained about two hundred inhabitants. Under the name Schakba, an Ottoman village list of about the same year, 1870, found 39 houses and a population of 141, though the population count included only men.

In 1882, the PEF's Survey of Western Palestine (SWP) described it as "A small village on high ground, surrounded with trees."

British Mandate era
In the 1922 census of Palestine, conducted by the British Mandate authorities, Shuqba had a population of 530 Muslims, increasing in the 1931 census to 696, still all Muslims, in a total of 130 houses.

In the 1945 statistics, the population was 840, all Muslims, while the total land area was 15,013 dunams, according to an official land and population survey. Of this, 1,496 were allocated for plantations and irrigable land, 5,053 for cereals, while 16 dunams were classified as built-up (urban) areas.

Jordanian era
In the wake of the 1948 Arab–Israeli War, and after the 1949 Armistice Agreements, Shuqba came under Jordanian rule. It was annexed by Jordan in 1950.

In 1961, the population of Shuqba was  1,241 persons.

Post-1967
Since the Six-Day War in 1967, Shuqba  has been under Israeli occupation. The population in the 1967 census conducted by the Israeli authorities was 885, of whom 54 originated from the Israeli territory.

After the 1995 accords, 8.4% of  Shuqba’s land was classified as Area B, and the remaining 91.6% as Area C. The Israeli West Bank barrier is partly built on village land, isolating 1,352 dunums (10%) of the village on the west side of the wall. Israel has also confiscated village land for bypass roads, military checkpoints, and for the construction of an Israeli stone crusher. The extracted stone material is transferred to Israel, in breach of international law.

References

Bibliography

External links
Welcome to Shuqba
Survey of Western Palestine, Map 14:  IAA, Wikimedia commons 
  Shuqba (fact sheet),  Applied Research Institute–Jerusalem (ARIJ)
Shuqba village profile, (ARIJ)
 Shuqba (aerial photo), (ARIJ)

Villages in the West Bank
Ramallah and al-Bireh Governorate
Natufian sites
Municipalities of the State of Palestine